Piprahan railway station is a halt railway station on Muzaffarpur–Gorakhpur main line under the Samastipur railway division of East Central Railway zone. This is situated at Piprahan Asli in Muzaffarpur district of the Indian state of Bihar.

References

Railway stations in Muzaffarpur district
Samastipur railway division